Mulla Mahmud Jaunpuri (1606–1651) was an important Indian natural philosopher and astronomer of the 17th century. Book II of his classic Shams-e-Bazeghi is on theoretical astronomy, where he raises doubts about the Ptolemaic system. He discusses various views on the spots of the Moon, refutes them and advances his own theory that these are some tiny bodies on which the Sun's light does not reflect.

He has a number of works on natural philosophy and logic to his credit. It is related that he requested Emperor Shah Jahan to sanction a place suitable for setting up of an observatory but as the emperor was busy in wars and other state problems he could not get enough time to examine the feasibility of the project.

His work Shams-e-Bazeghi is supposed to be the most important work of an Indian in natural philosophy written in Arabic. The original title was Hikmat-e-Balegha but the author himself elucidated the contents and named the revised version Shams-e-Bazeghi. In this treatise, he refuted the doctrine of atemporal origination (huduth-e-dahri) proposed by the Iranian philosopher Mir Damad.

1606 births
1651 deaths
17th-century Indian Muslims
17th-century Indian astronomers
17th-century Indian philosophers
Hanafis
Maturidis
People from Jaunpur, Uttar Pradesh